Anhalt, a historical region of Germany, has formed part of the state of Saxony-Anhalt since 1990.

Anhalt may refer to:

Places 
 Principality of Anhalt, a state of the Holy Roman Empire, at times partitioned into:
 Anhalt-Aschersleben
 Anhalt-Bernburg
 Anhalt-Dessau
 Anhalt-Köthen
 Anhalt-Zerbst
 Duchy of Anhalt, formed in 1863 after the unification of the above entities
 Free State of Anhalt, a state of Germany formed in 1918 after the abolition of the duchy
 The Roman Catholic Apostolic Vicariate of Anhalt

People 
 The ruling House of Ascania, also known as House of Anhalt
 Adolph II, Prince of Anhalt-Köthen (1458–1526), Bishop of Merseburg
 Edna Anhalt (1914–1987), screenwriter
 Edward Anhalt (1914–2000), screenwriter, producer, and documentary film-maker
 Fred Anhalt (1896-1996), builder and contractor
 Frédéric Prinz von Anhalt (born 1943), socialite
 Günther Anhalt (1906–1945), Waffen-SS officer
 István Anhalt (1919–2012), composer
 Princess Magdalena Augusta of Anhalt-Zerbst (1679–1740), Duchess of Saxe-Gotha-Altenburg
 Princess Marie-Auguste of Anhalt (1898–1983), wife of Prince Joachim of Prussia

See also 
Anhalt Hall in Comal County, Texas
Anholt (disambiguation)
Anholt (Denmark), a small island in the Kattegat, sometimes rendered as "Anhalt" in English